I'm Doing It is the debut studio album by Australian Indie pop singer E^ST. The album was announced on 10 March 2020, and was originally scheduled for release on 10 June 2020 but was delayed until 31 July 2020 due to the COVID-19 pandemic. Two secret shows planned for Melbourne and Sydney were also cancelled.

Speaking to Eat This Music, E^ST explains I'm Doing It "is an album about feeling like you don't have your act together and trying to navigate heartbreak and mental health struggles while trying to better yourself as a person."

The album was nominated for Best Album at the 2021 Rolling Stone Australia Awards.

Critical reception

Dylan Marshall of The AU Review said "First and foremost, I'm Doing It portrays E^ST as an artist who’s freshly out of a relationship and looking at not only getting through it, but becoming a better person because of it". Marshall went on to say "[it's] an album full of emotion, story telling and embracing the basic needs and wants of being a human; I'm Doing It is a rollercoaster of emotions."

In a positive review, James d'Apice of The Music AU said "If an artist is pretty good by their late teens - as E^ST was - there's an expectation that by their early 20s they should be near their peak. Anything less would be a disappointment. Here, with E^ST’s debut album, we hold that most delicious of cultural products: potential realised. Treasure this."
 
Poppy Reid of Rolling Stone Australia said the album "shows a maturity redolent of a person who was not only willing to feel every piece of their heart when it broke, but also displayed each piece in front of them, examining the fractures before piecing it back together."

Jackson Langford of Music Feeds exclaimed "Naming your debut album I'm Doing It is a bold and soul-bearing move. It can be said in a defiant and resistant way. It can be said in a defeatist and morose way. It can be said with eyes closed and heart open, as you prepare to dive headfirst into the deep unknown. E^ST goes through all that and then some on her long-awaited first LP, as she struggles to process heartbreak and scrambles to put the pieces back together again."

Track listing

Charts

Release history

References

E^ST albums
2020 debut albums
Warner Records albums